The Iowa State Cyclones Hall of Fame is a hall of fame that recognizes former student-athletes that achieved great success during their time at Iowa State University over the past 120 years.

History

The Hall of Fame was first created in 1997.  Since the program's inception in 1997, there have been 161 individuals inducted.

Induction process

Former student-athletes can be nominated by either athletic department employees or members of the Letterwinners Club.  A nominated committee is selected by the Letterwinners Club executive committee who then selects members for induction. A varying number of members are inducted each year.

Each fall during Letterwinners Weekend, the Iowa State Letterwinners Club hosts the Iowa State University Athletics Hall of Fame induction ceremony. Inductees are honored at a Friday night banquet at which each honoree is presented a medallion and given the opportunity to speak and they are then honored at halftime of the football game the following day.

Members

References

General

Specific

External links
Iowa State University Athletics Hall of Fame

Hall
College sports halls of fame in the United States
Halls of fame in Iowa
Sports in Iowa
Awards established in 1997
1997 establishments in Iowa